Happy End Camenca was a Moldovan football club based in Camenca, Moldova. The team played in the Moldovan National Division, the top division in Moldovan football.

Achievements
Divizia B
 Winners (1): 1999–2000

External links
 Happy End Camenca  at WeltFussballArchive

Defunct football clubs in Moldova
Association football clubs established in 1999
Association football clubs disestablished in 2002
1999 establishments in Moldova
2002 disestablishments in Moldova
Football clubs in Transnistria